WLUW (88.7 FM) is a college radio station owned and operated by Loyola University Chicago, serving Chicago, Illinois and its northern suburbs.

History

WLUW was founded in the 1970s, although it originally was not associated with Loyola University.  The station was originally as "The Hitline", then "High Energy 88-7 FM" in the late 1980s, and then simply "Energy 88-7".  In the mid-1990s the station changed radio formats to 88.7 Listener Supported Community Radio. Loyola University Chicago ceased funding WLUW in 2002, turning over operational control of the station to WBEZ.  WLUW became financially independent in 2007 .

In 2008, Loyola resumed control of the station

Around the time of the ownership change, some station personnel left WLUW to form competitor the Chicago Independent Radio Project (CHIRP).

In the fall of 2009, WLUW moved its headquarters from Damen Hall on the Lake Shore Campus to the Terry Student Center located downtown on E. Pearson St. at the Water Tower Campus.

Previous format
In the 1980s through the mid-1990s, the station had a contemporary hit and dance music radio format (High Energy 88-7 FM and then Energy 88-7 FM), modeled after commercial radio stations such as B-96 in Chicago, with a full staff of student disc jockeys and news anchors/reporters.  During this period, WLUW broadcast from the Loyola Water Tower Campus Communication building at 26 E. Pearson in Chicago.

Notable station alumni
 Maureen Maher, news correspondent with CBS News' 48 Hours
 Susan Carlson, WMAQ-TV anchorwoman in Chicago
 Brian Wheeler, a Portland, Oregon sports personality who is in his tenth season as the radio play-by-play voice of the Portland Trail Blazers"
 Tomas Martinez, vice president/general manager for Radio Caracol 1260 AM Miami (WSUA)
 Robyne Robinson, co-anchor for Fox affiliate KMSP-TV in Minneapolis-St. Paul
 Ernie Manouse, Emmy-nominated and Katie Award-winning TV interviewer/producer of the PBS show InnerVIEWS with Ernie Manouse
 Alan Cox, former morning host at WXDX-FM-Pittsburgh, WKQX-Chicago & WDTW-Detroit. Now hosts an afternoon talk show at WMMS-Cleveland.

References

Radio Chicago Magazine - 1990 Summer and Winter editions

External links
 Official website

Loyola University Chicago
LUW
LUW
Radio stations established in 1982
1982 establishments in Illinois